"Digital Love" is a song by French electronic music duo Daft Punk. It was released as the third single from the album Discovery on 11 June 2001 and reached number 33 in France, number 28 in Italy, and number 14 in the United Kingdom. As part of the album, the song is featured in the film Interstella 5555: The 5tory of the 5ecret 5tar 5ystem.

Composition
As documented in the Discovery liner notes, the song features a sample of "I Love You More" by George Duke. The sample was worked into an electronic pop song about unspoken love with lyrics by DJ Sneak and vocals performed by Daft Punk. Friend and occasional collaborator Chilly Gonzales remarked upon the unresolved chord progression derived from the sample, noting that the suspended harmonies contribute to the song's sense of longing and desire.

The track is known for the solo featured prominently on its second half. Thomas Bangalter revealed that the solo was created using a mixture of elements, aided by music sequencers. "No one plays solos in their songs anymore, but we wanted to include some on the album." Guy-Manuel de Homem-Christo also noted the duo's use of in-studio equipment to evoke the sound of a previous artist:

Music video
The video was released in 2001 and would later appear as part the 2003 anime film Interstella 5555: The 5tory of the 5ecret 5tar 5ystem.

Immediately following the events that occurred in the "Aerodynamic" video, the alien planet's security guards regain enough consciousness to send a distress signal to a distant astronaut named Shep. At first, Shep is seen cleaning his spaceship's exterior while singing along with the song's lyrics. After completing the task, he returns to the ship and lounges around in his bedroom, filled with memorabilia of the alien band. He drifts into a daydream where he dances with his crush, the band's female bass player (later named Stella), in mid-air.

Shep's dream comes to an abrupt halt when he is awakened by the distress signal sent to him. To his horror, he learns of the band's abduction and current state of the alien planet, immediately pursuing after the kidnappers. After the chase leads through a warp hole, the kidnappers make a safe landing with the unconscious alien band at their base on Earth, with Shep crash-landing into a nearby forest, temporarily rendering him unconscious. The kidnappers take the sedated captives into the base's lab for the events that take place in the "Harder, Better, Faster, Stronger" video.

Reception
"Digital Love" charted backed with "Aerodynamic" due to equal club play. It charted at number 14 on the UK Singles Chart and reached number nine on the Hot Dance Music/Club Play chart in the United States. It also reached number 67 in Australia, promoted along with its B-side, "Aerodynamic".

The song was featured in a GAP television advertisement. It featured both members of Daft Punk wearing their robotic helmets and gloves as well as GAP denim shirts and jeans. They appeared dancing with Juliette Lewis. When asked about Daft Punk's dancing in the ad, Guy-Manuel de Homem-Christo stated "It looks really simple to do, but when you're on a step with the crew, it's really not, even though the choreographer was really nice." "Digital Love" was also used by Nokia for a commercial of the Nokia 5300, and several MTV programs Is It College Yet?, Pimp my Ride, Date My Mom and Next.

The American band Hellogoodbye often uses the first two verses of "Digital Love" in place of the second verse of the song "Here (In Your Arms)" when performing live. A live version of the song, performed by Danish group Alphabeat is available as part of an iTunes Live EP.

Track listings

Charts

Certifications

Release history

References

External links
 Daft Punk official site
 Daft Punk official site (German)
 Virgin Records Daft Punk official site

2001 singles
2001 songs
Animated music videos
Daft Punk songs
Songs written by Guy-Manuel de Homem-Christo
Songs written by Thomas Bangalter
Virgin Records singles